First settled circa 1883, Oslo is an unincorporated community in southeastern Indian River County, Florida, United States. It is part of the Sebastian–Vero Beach Metropolitan Statistical Area. The town of Oslo, as it was once called, was first established by some of Indian River County's first pioneers, which included the Helseth, Gifford, and Hallstrom families. The area was given the name Oslo by the Helseth family.

References

Unincorporated communities in Indian River County, Florida
Unincorporated communities in Florida
1883 establishments in Florida
Populated places established in 1883